Al G. Barnes may refer to:

 Alpheus George Barnes Stonehouse (1862–1931), Canadian impresario
 Al G. Barnes Circus, the traveling circus he founded